Barnsley Warren is a  biological Site of Special Scientific Interest in Gloucestershire, notified in 1954 and renotified in 1984. The site is also included in A Nature Conservation Review. It lies in a steep-sided dry valley, east of the A429, northeast of Cirencester in the Cotswolds. The site is listed in the 'Cotswold District' Local Plan 2001-2011 (on line) as a Key Wildlife Site (KWS).

Following the introduction of the Countryside and Rights of Way Act, the whole of the site was designated "access land" and is therefore open to public access.

There are seven units of assessment and the Gloucestershire Pasqueflower Reserve is unit 4.

Gloucestershire Pasqueflower Reserve
 Natural England SSSI information on Barnsley Warren
Detailed information is published in the Gloucestershire Wildlife Trust nature reserves handbook.

Pasqueflower (Pulsatilla vulgaris) is found in larger quantities here than anywhere else in the Cotswolds, which are at the western limit of this species' European range. The flowers bloom in late April or early May. The population has been estimated at over twenty thousand plants.

This is a south-west facing slope of Oolitic limestone slope. The thin rendzina soils become richer colluvial deposits in the valley floor. There is a typical Cotswold winterwell in the south-east corner. When this floods in winter it becomes the source of the Ampney Brook.

Other notable plants and species
The Gloucestershire Wildlife Trust reserves handbook lists species. Other notable plants found at the site include man orchid (Aceras anthropophorum), musk orchid (Herminimum monorchis), slender bedstraw (Galium pumilum), chalk milkwort (Polgala calcarea), round-headed rampion (Phyteuma tenerum) and bastard-toadflax (Thesium humifusum).

The diverse range of flowers and grasses is ideal for many downland insects and the reserve has particular good butterfly and bug populations. Recorded are small blue, chalkhill blue and dark green fritillary butterflies and the cydnid shield bug, Sehirus dubius, feeds on the bastard-toadflax. The heath snail, recorded for the site, is an indicator of ancient grassland.

Conservation
The site is grazed to prevent the dominant growth of upright brome and tor-grass.

Plant communities
The plant community in which the pasqueflower grows is CG5 (Bromus erectus - Brachypodium pinnatum grassland) in the British National Vegetation Classification

References

SSSI source
 Natural England SSSI information on the citation
 Natural England SSSI information on the Barnsley Warren units

External links
 Natural England (SSSI information)
 Gloucestershire Wildlife Trust

Sites of Special Scientific Interest in Gloucestershire
Sites of Special Scientific Interest notified in 1954
Nature Conservation Review sites
Nature reserves in Gloucestershire
Cotswolds